Achton Mikkelsen (born 7 October 1932) is a Danish boxer. He competed in the men's middleweight event at the 1960 Summer Olympics.

References

External links
 

1932 births
Living people
Danish male boxers
Olympic boxers of Denmark
Boxers at the 1960 Summer Olympics
People from Silkeborg
Middleweight boxers
Sportspeople from the Central Denmark Region